Ferhat Akbaş (born April 12, 1986) is a Turkish volleyball coach and former volleyball player. He is the head coach of Eczacıbaşı Dynavit. He also trained Japan women's national team and Turkey Women.

He is a graduate of business administration from Kocaeli University.

Career

Player
At first Akbaş wanted to become a basketball player, however as he missed the date of the qualification, found himself in volleyball. He played volleyball in Marmara College and Arçelik volleyball clubs. Ferhat Akbaş was a member of the Turkey men's national volleyball team. His career as a player did not last long as he chose to pursue a coaching career.

Coach
He began his technical staff career as a statistics coach at Galatasaray women's volleyball team in 2004, and continued until 2006. The next season, he transferred to Türk Telekom Ankara to serve in the same position. His next post was the assistant coach of Lang Ping at Türk Telekom Ankara in the 2011–12 season. Then, he followed her to China, where he served from 2011 to 2012, and enjoyed champion title with Evergrande Hengda team. In the playing-free summer time, he went to Turkey to serve as statistics coach of Serbian-French Veljko Basic, who was the head coach of the Turkey men's volleyball team.

During his time in China, he received an offer from Vakıfbank women's team to serve as assistant coach of Giovanni Guidetti. In 2013, he became the assistant coach of Massimo Barbolini at Turkey women's national volleyball team.

At the age of only 28, he was appointed head coach of the Turkish women's national team, which won the gold medal at the 2014 Women's European Volleyball League. At the final match, he guided the Turkish team to victory against the German national team, which was coached by his former boss Giovanni Guidetti.

On 29 April 2021 Eczacibasi Vitra announced the appointment of Ferhat Akbaş as the new Head Coach of Eczacıbaşı VitrA. Akbaş who won the Polish League title last season as the coach of Chemik Police will be the Head Coach starting with the 2021-2022 season.

Honours

As assistant coach

Clubs
 Evergrande Hengda
 Winner (1):
 2011–12 Chinese Volleyball League
 Vakıfbank
 Winners (6):
 2012–13 Turkish Women's Volleyball League
 2013–14 Turkish Women's Volleyball League
 2012–13 Turkish Women's Volleyball Cup
 2013 FIVB Volleyball Women's Club World Championship
 2012–13 CEV Women's Champions League
 2013 Turkish Women's Volleyball Cup
 Runner-up (1):
 2013–14 CEV Women's Champions League -

As coach

National team
 Winners (3):
 2014 Women's European Volleyball League
 2015 Montreux Volley Masters
 2015 European Games
 Runners-up (1)
 2015 FIVB Volleyball Women's U23 World Championship

Club Team
Winners (2)
 Romanian Championship 2017–18
 Romanian Cup 2017–18

References

1986 births
Kocaeli University alumni
Turkish men's volleyball players
Turkish volleyball coaches 
Turkish expatriate sportspeople in Romania
Expatriate sportspeople in China
Living people
Volleyball coaches of international teams
Turkey women's national volleyball team coaches